Cortenova (Valassinese ) is a comune (municipality) in the Province of Lecco in the Italian region Lombardy, located about  northeast of Milan and about  north of Lecco.

Cortenova borders the following municipalities:

Crandola Valsassina, 
Esino Lario, 
Primaluna, 
Taceno.

References

External links
 Official website

Cities and towns in Lombardy
Valsassina